Special K is a breakfast cereal manufactured by Kellogg Company.

Special K may also refer to:

People
Stagenamed
 Special K (rapper), a rapper and original member of the Treacherous Three

Nicknamed
 Kell Brook, boxer
 Kevin Daley, basketball player
Karmichael Hunt, rugby league footballer
Greg Kelser, American basketball player and color commentator
 Alan Kulwicki, American race car driver
Thanasi Kokkinakis, tennis player

Art, entertainment, and media
 "Special K" (song), a song by the rock band Placebo
Special K: The Wisdom of Terry Kay, a 2000 book by Terry Kay

Other uses
 Special K, a nickname for the drug ketamine
 Special Kay, the last airworthy Douglas B-26K Invader owned and being restored by the Pacific Prowler organization in Fort Worth, Texas

See also